Anita or ANITA may refer to:

Arts
Anita (1967 film), an Indian film
Anita (2009 film), an Argentine film
Anita (2021 film), a Hong Kong film
Anita: Swedish Nymphet, a 1973 erotic film

People
Anita (given name), people with the given name Anita

Places 
Anita, Indiana, a former town in Johnson County, Indiana
Anita, Iowa, city in Cass County, Iowa
Anita, Pennsylvania
Batey Anita Airport, in Consuelo, Dominican Republic
Lake Anita State Park, state park in Cass County, Iowa, US
Santa Anita (disambiguation)

Science and technology 
Amblypodia anita, a species of blue butterfly
ANITA grade, a group of plants consisting of the most basal angiosperm lineages
Antarctic Impulsive Transient Antenna experiment
Sumlock ANITA calculator

Storms 
Hurricane Anita, an Atlantic hurricane in 1977
Tropical Storm Anita (disambiguation)

See also
Anitta (disambiguation)